The Lika is a river in Croatia which gives its name to the Lika region.
Its average discharge at the measurement station in Bilaj (covering 225 km2 of the basin) is 7.33 m3/s, and it can go completely dry.

It is known as a sinking river because at the end of its course, it flows into a series of ponors or swallow-holes and disappears from the surface. The Lika River rises near the village of Kukljić at the foot of the Velebit Mountains, flows in a northwesterly direction past the town of Gospić, enters and leaves Lake Krušćica, and continues to the northwest until it sinks into the karst topography at ponors near Lipovo Polje.

References

 Bonacci, Ognjen and Andric, Ivo. carsologica.zrc-sazu.si Sinking Karst Rivers Hydrology: Case of the Lika and Gacka (Croatia)

Rivers of Croatia
Landforms of Lika-Senj County